Bal Dhuri is a Marathi theatre actor. He married Jayshree Gadkar, the noted Marathi and Hindi movie actress. He is best known for his multiple roles in Marathi movies and his portrayal of King Dasharatha in Ramanand Sagar's TV serial, Ramayana (where Jayshree played his wife, Kaushalya), also Acted In Movie Tere Mere Sapne 1996 as Secretary On Chadrachur Singh.

He was instrumental in giving a break to veteran actor Shivaji Satam in the musical drama Sangeet Varad.

Filmography

See also
 Jayshree Gadkar

References

External links
 

Living people
Indian male stage actors
Indian male film actors
Male actors in Hindi cinema
Marathi actors
Male actors in Marathi theatre
Male actors in Marathi cinema
Year of birth missing (living people)